Montignies-sur-Roc is a village of Wallonia and district of the municipality of Honnelles, located in the province of Hainaut, Belgium. The village is located amidst the "Parc naturel des Hauts-Pays". The village is located near the French border, along the river la Petite Honnelle. The village is home to the Brasserie de l'Abbaye des Rocs, a brewery where Abbaye des Rocs, Blanche de Honnelles, Montagnards and Altitude 6 are brewed. Points of interest in the village include a watermill from 1758, a Notre-Dame Church from the 18th century, and a small artificial cave, Calvary, built in the 18th century.

References

See also
 Brasserie des Rocs (brewery)

Former municipalities of Hainaut (province)